The 2013 Hawaii Rainbow Warriors football team represented the University of Hawaii at Mānoa in the 2013 NCAA Division I FBS football season. The team was led by second-year head coach Norm Chow and played their home games at Aloha Stadium. They were members of the Mountain West Conference in the West Division. They finished the season 1–11, 0–8 in Mountain West play to finish in last place in the West Division.

Schedule

Game summaries

USC

at Oregon State

at Nevada

Fresno State

San Jose State

at UNLV

Colorado State

at Utah State

at Navy

San Diego State

at Wyoming

Army

Depth chart

References

Hawaii
Hawaii Rainbow Warriors football seasons
Hawaii Rainbow Warriors football